New Horizons is a studio album by American country music artist Dottie West, released in 1983.

This was another unsuccessful album for Dottie West. Her chart success continued to spiral downward, as the result of poor record sales from her previous album, as well as this album. This was the last album released by West under Liberty Records (which had its name changed from United Artists in 1980). A single from the album, "Tulsa Ballroom" became West's last Top 40 Country hit in her solo career. The other single from the album, "The Night Love Let You Down", didn't chart, her first single not to do so since her career on major labels began in 1963. The album did chart on the "Top Country Albums" chart (this would be West's last chart appearance on the "Top Country Albums" chart), but didn't go farther than No. 65.  West was 50 at the time and although a highly popular concert artist her mainstream success on records was fading out like several of her other contemporaries, being overtaken by a new generation of stars. Two songs from this album eventually appeared on albums by other artists. Barbara Mandrell and Steve Wariner recorded "Overnight Sensation", which appeared on Mandrell's album Spun Gold in 1983. It is notable that Steve Wariner was an artist that was helped greatly by Dottie in the beginning of his career, touring as part of her backing band much like Larry Gatlin. The other song "Read My Lips" was a Top 5 single for Marie Osmond in 1986. It appears on her There's No Stopping Your Heart album.

Track listing

Chart performance

Album

Singles

References

Dottie West albums
1983 albums
Albums produced by Snuff Garrett
Liberty Records albums